Supermac's is an Irish fast food restaurant chain first opened in 1978. The first restaurant was located in Ballinasloe, County Galway, in the West of Ireland. As of 2019, the chain consists of a total of 118 restaurants spread throughout Ireland (in both the Republic of Ireland and Northern Ireland). It operates a number of franchise outlets with many also privately owned. Supermac's serves an average of 320,000 customers per week and had annual revenues of €79.9 million and a profit of €7.4 million according to its 2013 closing report.

Its head office is in the Ballybrit Business Park in Ballybrit, County Galway.

History

The first restaurant was opened in Ballinasloe, County Galway, in the West of Ireland in 1978, by Pat and Una McDonagh. A second restaurant opened two years later in Gort, followed by an Eyre Square premises in Galway city which opened in 1982.

, Supermac's was the largest Irish-owned quick service food chain, with over 100 outlets across the Republic and Northern Ireland. In June 2014, Supermac's opened its 100th store in the Barack Obama Plaza on the M7 Motorway. Supermac's also exclusively operates the Papa John's Pizza brand in Ireland as well as SuperSubs, which replaces the Quiznos franchise that Supermac's formerly held. The company employed over 4,000 people as of 2020.

Corporate overview

Name

The Restaurant was named together by locals and its owners: The founder, Pat McDonagh, earned the nickname ‘Supermac’ whilst playing Gaelic football for the Carmelite College in Moate. This then became the choice of name for his business, "Supermac’s".

International operations
Through Supermac's Ireland Ltd, Pat and Una McDonagh also own Claddagh Irish Pubs & Restaurants, a chain of eleven Irish-themed bars & restaurants operating in 8 Midwestern states in the United States.

Supermac's is Ireland's largest indigenous quick service restaurant group. Supermac's Holdings Ltd. has applied to trademark the Supermac's name in both Europe and Australia with McDonagh stating, in 2015, that he was planning on "responding to demands coming from fifteen cities internationally for the opening of Supermac's restaurants".

In 2013, the company expanded its motor services business by developing the Tipperary Town Plaza and Mallow N20 Plaza on national primary routes. The company opened another Plaza in Kiltullagh, Galway at the M6 Loughrea Junction in February 2016.

Hotels
The company has also expanded its hospitality business interests through the purchase and development of the Castletroy Park Hotel, Limerick, Loughrea Hotel & Spa, Galway and Charleville Park Hotel, Cork and The Killeshin Hotel, Portlaoise. and Castle Oaks House Hotel. in Limerick.

Advertising 
Supermac's initiated the "Bring them Home" campaign where they reunited families, whose relatives were living around the world, for Christmas. Between 2012 and 2013 Supermac's flew 43 people who had emigrated from Ireland during the economic recession to locations worldwide back to Ireland to be with their families and friends over the festive season. The campaign was promoted on 2FM’s Tubridy Show and through RTÉ One’s The Late Late Show, where the winners surprised their families by being reunited live on air during Christmas week. Supermac's campaign appeared in Times Square (7th Avenue) in New York City.

In 2012, the chain was included in a list of "10 fast-food restaurants you haven't heard of" by the Daily Meal programme on Fox News, while USA Today included Supermac's in a list of "Top Foreign Chains we want to move Stateside" in 2013.

Sponsorship
Supermac's sponsors a number of sporting organisations. As of 2018, the company's association with Galway hurling was the longest running inter-county GAA sponsorship in the country, then in its twenty eighth year. In 2013, a deal was signed seeing both hurling and football in Galway sponsored by one organisation for the first time. The deal included sponsorship of Galway football and hurling across all age groups from under age through to senior. As of 2013, Supermac's had provided over €2 million to Galway's GAA county board.

The company also engages with other sports sponsorships such as rugby, soccer, international rules football (2005) and horseracing (Limerick, Ballinrobe races).

Other Supermac's sponsorships include The Ray Foley Show Programme (Today FM) Sponsorship from 2010 to 2012, and The Will Leahy Show (RTÉ 2FM) from 2012 to 2014.

The restaurant chain also sponsored the Volvo Ocean Race 2009 and 2012 during the Galway leg of the race. Supermac's was also a sponsor of Cannonball Ireland in 2012 and 2014.

EU trademarks case
McDonald's objected to Supermac's registration application to trademark its name and certain product names on the grounds that the names Supermac's and McDonald's are similar. In its submission McDonald's argued that the Supermac's name is visually similar to their trademark while Supermac's argue that they have traded alongside McDonald's in the Republic of Ireland for over 30 years without confusion. McDonald's won a partial victory, with the EU's Office for Harmonisation in the Internal Market (OHIM) ruling that Supermac's could trade under its own name in the EU, but it rejected Supermac's trademark applications for several items, including menu items. It said that consumers could "be confused as to whether Supermac’s is a new version of McDonald’s", given the almost identical products sold by both chains.

In January 2019, the EUIPO ruled that certain trademarks owned by McDonald's, including BIG MAC (in all capital letters), were to be revoked.

Charity
Supermac's has donated money to charities such as Trócaire and to local charities including Alan Kerrins African Projects. It has also hosted charity events in its outlets such as Today FM's Shave or Dye.

See also 
 List of hamburger restaurants
 List of Irish companies

References

External links

Ballinasloe
Fast-food chains of Ireland
Restaurants established in 1978
Irish brands